The Alhambra-Maurice Chevalier was a music hall located at 50, rue de Malte in the 11th arrondissement of Paris.  It opened on August 11, 1866, and after a long history, and many name changes, was finally demolished in 1967.  When the theatre originally opened, it was actually called the Cirque-Impérial—it was only in 1956 that Jane Breteau renamed it Alhambra-Maurice Chevalier, in honor of the beloved French actor and singer.

A new Alhambra opened in 2008. This is 300 meters from the site of the old Alhambra-Maurice Chevalier.

References

Former theatres in Paris
Former music venues in France
Music halls in Paris
11th arrondissement of Paris
Music venues completed in 1866
Theatres completed in 1866
Buildings and structures demolished in 1967
Demolished buildings and structures in France
1866 establishments in France
1967 disestablishments in France
Demolished buildings and structures in Paris